Louisa Ella Rhine (née Weckesser November 9, 1891 – March 17, 1983) was an American doctor of botany and is known for her work in parapsychology.  At the time of her death, she was recognized as the foremost researcher of spontaneous psychic experiences, and has been referred to as the “first lady of parapsychology.”

Life 
Rhine was born Louisa Ella Weckesser on an island in the Niagara River, New York on November 9, 1891. Her parents were Christian Weckesser, a gardener, orchardist, and farmer, and Ella Weckesser. The oldest of nine children, Rhine grew up in northern Ohio.

In 1920, she married J. B. Rhine, a fellow graduate student in botany. In 1927, the Rhines relocated to Durham, NC, where they raised four children together.

Education 
Influenced by her father's interest in plants, Rhine chose to study plant physiology. She attended the College of Wooster before obtaining her Bachelor of Science, Master of Science, and Ph.D., all in Botany, from the University of Chicago.

Career 
After serving as a research fellow in plant physiology at the Boyce Institute for Plant Research in Yonkers, New York, Rhine moved to Morgantown, West Virginia, where both she and her husband taught at West Virginia University. While there, she and her husband became interested in parapsychology, and left to train with Dr. Walter Franklin Prince of the Boston Society of Psychic Research from 1926–1927. The following year, they moved to Durham, North Carolina, where her husband had been recruited to the faculty to work under William McDougall at Duke University to help launch the university's parapsychology department.

In 1928, Rhine stopped working after she and her husband adopted a son, Robert.

Through the American Association of University Women, Rhine and Mary Octavine Thompson Cowper of Durham founded the Durham Nursery School, which was the first nursery school created for children of working women.

Additionally, Rhine worked with other Durham women to form the Durham Chapter of the League of Women Voters, and she pushed a bookmobile as a Gray Lady at Camp Butner during World War II. In 1948, Rhine returned to academia, and she began to work part-time at the parapsychology lab, where she took over a project of reading and responding to letters from people who had heard about the lab's work. This work led to her full-time focus on case studies of psychic experiences. She analyzed thousands of real-life experiences from the letters people sent to her, and she laid the groundwork for their classification.

Selected works

References

External links 
 Guide to the Louisa E. Rhine Papers, 1890-1983, Duke University

American botanists
20th-century American women scientists
1891 births
1983 deaths
Parapsychologists
Duke University faculty
American women academics